Elections to Omagh District Council were held on 5 May 2005 on the same day as the other Northern Irish local government elections. The election used three district electoral areas to elect a total of 21 councillors.

Election results

Note: "Votes" are the first preference votes.

Districts summary

|- class="unsortable" align="centre"
!rowspan=2 align="left"|Ward
! % 
!Cllrs
! % 
!Cllrs
! %
!Cllrs
! %
!Cllrs
! % 
!Cllrs
!rowspan=2|TotalCllrs
|- class="unsortable" align="center"
!colspan=2 bgcolor="" | Sinn Féin
!colspan=2 bgcolor="" | SDLP
!colspan=2 bgcolor="" | DUP
!colspan=2 bgcolor="" | UUP
!colspan=2 bgcolor="white"| Others
|-
|align="left"|Mid Tyrone
|bgcolor="#008800"|57.8
|bgcolor="#008800"|4
|19.0
|1
|11.2
|1
|12.1
|1
|0.0
|0
|7
|-
|align="left"|Omagh Town
|bgcolor="#008800"|25.5
|bgcolor="#008800"|2
|20.9
|1
|18.7
|1
|12.3
|1
|22.6
|2
|7
|-
|align="left"|West Tyrone
|bgcolor="#008800"|46.0
|bgcolor="#008800"|4
|18.5
|1
|21.0
|1
|14.5
|1
|0.0
|0
|7
|-
|- class="unsortable" class="sortbottom" style="background:#C9C9C9"
|align="left"| Total
|44.6
|10
|19.3
|3
|16.7
|3
|13.0
|3
|6.4
|2
|21
|-
|}

District results

Mid Tyrone

2001: 4 x Sinn Féin, 2 x SDLP, 1 x UUP
2005: 4 x Sinn Féin, 1 x SDLP, 1 x UUP, 1 x DUP
2001-2005 Change: DUP gain from SDLP

Omagh Town

2001: 2 x SDLP, 2 x Independent, 1 x Sinn Féin, 1 x DUP, 1 x UUP
2005: 2 x Sinn Féin, 2 x Independent, 1 x SDLP, 1 x DUP, 1 x UUP
2001-2005 Change: Sinn Féin gain from SDLP

West Tyrone

2001: 3 x Sinn Féin, 2 x SDLP, 1 x DUP, 1 x UUP
2005: 4 x Sinn Féin, 1 x SDLP, 1 x DUP, 1 x UUP
2001-2005 Change: Sinn Féin gain from SDLP

References

Omagh District Council elections
Omagh